Jayley Woo is a Singaporean actress. She was a full-time MediaCorp artiste from 2012 to 2018 but continues to work on an ad hoc basis.

Career
Woo was a blogger alongside her older twin sister, Hayley Woo, under the stage name Jay On The Hay.

In 2012, she made her debut by appearing in Jump! alongside Jeanette Aw and Zhang Zhenhuan. Her work in the series garnered her a Best Newcomer nomination at the Star Awards 2013.

In 2013, she starred in C.L.I.F., 96℃ Cafe and The Dream Makers. She also made a cameo appearance in Sudden.

In 2014, she filmed The Caregivers, C.L.I.F. 3 and Against The Tide. She was nominated for Top 10 Most Popular Female Artistes award at the Star Awards 2015 and won the award in Star Awards 2016 and Star Awards 2017.

In 2015, she filmed You Can Be an Angel Too, Tiger Mom and Super Senior and made a cameo appearance in The Journey: Our Homeland.

In 2016, she had her first leading role in The Queen. In the same year, she also filmed Beyond Words and Peace & Prosperity, made cameo appearances in Hero and Soul Reaper, a Toggle original series.

In 2017, she filmed Dream Coder, Have A Little Faith and Life Less Ordinary.

In 2018, she wrapped up filming in a Toggle original series, Love At Cavenagh Bridge, and a science fiction English series, Glitch!'. She also starred in Jalan Jalan''.

In July 2018, Woo left Mediacorp as a full-time artist. The actress wrote in a Facebook post on 3 July 2018 that she will still be taking on suitable acting roles despite leaving Mediacorp. Woo is reportedly pursuing potential opportunities overseas, including possible projects in China.

Personal life
Woo studied in Tanglin Secondary School and ITE Clementi.

Woo was in a clandestine relationship with actor Aloysius Pang which first started from 2017. Shortly after his death, Woo revealed that they'd only planned to go public after the wedding.

On 23 October 2022, Woo announced her engagement and her pregnancy. Their marriage was registered on 27 December 2022. Their daughter was born on 20 January 2023.

Filmography

TV series

English-language

Mandarin-language

Telemovie

Film

Awards and nominations

References

External links

1991 births
Singaporean actresses
Singaporean people of Chinese descent
Singaporean people of Cantonese descent
Place of birth missing (living people)
Living people